Kim is a common family name among ethnic Koreans. Approximately 22% of ethnic Koreans are named Kim. This is a list of notable people with the Korean family name Kim.

Business
Bom Kim (born 1978), Korean-American founder of Coupang
Kim Beom-soo (born 1966), chairman of Kakao
Kim Jung-ju (born 1968), founder of Nexon
Michael Kim (born 1963), founder of MBK Partners, a private equity company
Vladimir Kim (born 1960), Kazakhstani businessman of Korean descent, President of KAZ Minerals
Kim Woo-choong (1936-2019), chairman and founder of Daewoo

Entertainment

General 
 Kim Eana (born 1979), South Korean lyricist
 Kim Gura (born 1970), South Korean comedian
 Jenny Kim (born 1994), South Korean model and beauty pageant titleholder
 Kim Ji-min (born 1984), South Korean comedian
 Jonah Kim (born 1988), South Korean cellist
 Kim Jong-kook (born 1976), South Korean entertainer
 Kim Jun-ho (born 1975), South Korean comedian
 Kim Ki-duk (1960–2020), South Korean director
 Kim Ki-duk (1934–2017), South Korean director
 Kim Kyung-ju (born 1976), South Korean poet and performance artist
 Marina Kim (born 1983), Russian television presenter
 Kim Saeng-min (born 1973), South Korean television presenter and comedian
 Kim Se-yeon (known as Geguri, born 1999), professional Overwatch League player
 Kim Sook (born 1975), South Korean comedian
 Kim Taek-yong (known as Bisu), South Korean Starcraft professional gamer
 Tanya Kim, Korean-Canadian television personality
 Kim Yeon-jung (known as Kenzie, born 1976), South Korean songwriter and producer
 Kim Young-woon (stage name Kangin, born 1985), South Korean former singer, actor, television host and radio personality

Actors and actresses 
 Kim Ah-joong (born 1982), South Korean actress
 Alan Kim (born 2012), American actor
 Kim Bum (born 1989), South Korean actor
 Claudia Kim (born 1985), Korean actress
 Kim Da-mi (born 1995), South Korean actress
 Daniel Dae Kim (born 1968), Korean-American actor
 Kim Dong-hee (born 1999), South Korean actor
 Kim Dong-ho (born 1985), South Korean actor
 Kim Dong-wook (born 1983), South Korean actor
 Kim Ha-neul (born 1978), South Korean actress
 Kim Hae-sook (born 1955), South Korean actress
 Kim Hee-ae (born 1967), South Korean actress
 Kim Hee-sun (born 1977), South Korean actress
 Kim Hye-jun (born 1995), South Korean actress 
 Kim Jaewon (born 1981), South Korean actor
 Kim Jae-kyung (born 1988), South Korean actress and singer
 Kim Jeong-hoon (born 1980), South Korean actor and singer 
 Kim Ji-eun (born 1993), South Korean actress
 Kim Ji-hoon (born 1981), South Korean actor
 Kim Ji-soo (born 1993), South Korean actor
 Kim Ji-soo (born 1972), South Korean actress
 Kim Ji-won (born 1992), South Korean actress
 Go Yoon (born 1988 as Kim Jong-min), South Korean actor
 Kim Jong-soo (born 1964), South Korean actor
 Kim Joo-hun (born 1980), South Korean actor
 Kim Joo-hyuk (1972–2017), South Korean actor
 Kim Joon (born 1984), South Korean actor and rapper
 Kim Kang-hoon (born 2009), South Korean child actor
 Kim Kang-min (born 1998), South Korean actor
 Kim Kang-woo (born 1978), South Korean actor
 Kim Kap-soo (born 1957), South Korean actor
 Kim Ki-bang (born 1981), South Korean actor
 Kim Ki-bum (born 1987), South Korean actor and singer
 Kim Ki-hyeon, South Korean voice actor
 Kim Kwang-kyu (born 1967), South Korean actor
 Kim Kwon (born 1989), South Korean actor
 Kim Kyu-chul (born 1960), South Korean actor
 Kim Kyung-nam (born 1989), South Korean actor
 Kim Mi-ae (stage name Oh Yeon-ah, born 1981), South Korean actress
 Kim Mi-soo (1992–2022), South Korean actress
 Kim Min-hee (born 1982), South Korean actress
 Kim Min-seok (born 1990), South Korean actor
 Kim Nam-gil (born 1980), South Korean actor
 Kim Nam-joo (born 1971), South Korean actress
 Kim Rae-won (born 1981), South Korean actor
 Kim Sa-rang (born 1978), South Korean actress
 Kim Sae-ron (born 2000), South Korean actress
 Kim Seon-ho (born 1986), South Korean actor
 Kim Seung-jun (born 1967), South Korean voice actor
 Kim Yu-bin (stage name Kim Yewon, born 1987), South Korean actress and singer
 Kim So-eun (born 1989), South Korean actress
 Kim So-yeon (born 1980), South Korean actress
 Kim So-hyun (born 1999), South Korean actress
 Kim Soo-hyun (born 1988), South Korean actor
 Kim Soo-mi (born 1949), South Korean actress
 Kim Soo-ro (born 1970), South Korean actor
 Kim Suk-hoon (born 1972), South Korean actor
 Kim Sun-a (born 1975), South Korean actress
 Kim Tae-hee (born 1980), South Korean actress
 Kim Tae-pyung (stage name Hyun Bin, 1982), South Korean actor
 Kim Woo-bin (born 1989), South Korean actor and model
 Kim Yong-rim (born 1940), South Korean veteran actress
 Kim Yoo-jin (stage name Eugene, born 1981), South Korean actress and singer
 Kim Yoo-jung (born 1999), South Korean actress
 Kim Young-ok (born 1937), South Korean actress
 Kim Yun-jin (born 1973), Korean-American actress
 Kim Sang-eun (stage name Lee Ji Ah, born 1978), South Korean actress

Singers 
 Allen Kim (born 1990), South Korean male singer, former member of boy band U-KISS
 Kim Bok-ja (also known as Akiko Wada, born 1950), Zainichi Korean female singer
 Kim Bum-soo (born 1979), South Korean male singer
 Kim Chae-won (born 2000), South Korean female singer, member of girl group Le Sserafim
 Kim Chan-mi (born Im Chan-mi, 1996), South Korean female singer, member of girl group AOA
 Kim Chung-ha (born Kim Chan-mi, 1996), South Korean female singer, former member of girl group I.O.I
 Kim Da-hyun (born 1998), South Korean female rapper, member of girl group Twice
 Kim Da-som (born 1993), South Korean female singer and actress, former member of girl group Sistar
 Kim Do-yeon (born 1999), South Korean female singer, member of girl group Weki Meki
 Kim Dong-ryul (born 1974), South Korean male singer-songwriter
 Kim Dong-wan (born 1979), South Korean male entertainer, member of boy band Shinhwa
 Kim Dong-young (stage name Doyoung, born 1996), South Korean male singer, member of boy band NCT
 Eli Kim (born 1991), Korean-American male singer, member of boy band U-KISS
 Kim Gun-mo (born 1968), South Korean male singer-songwriter
 Kim Han-bin (stage name B.I, born 1996), South Korean male rapper, singer-songwriter and record producer
 Kim Hee-chul (born 1983), South Korean male singer, member of boy band Super Junior
 Kim Hyo-jin (stage name JeA, born 1981), South Korean female singer, member of girl group Brown Eyed Girls
 Kim Hyo-jong (stage name Dawn, born 1994), South Korean male rapper and singer-songwriter
 Kim Hyo-jung (stage name Hyolyn, born 1990), South Korean female singer, former member of girl group Sistar
 Kim Hyo-yeon (born 1989), South Korean female singer, member of girl group Girls' Generation and supergroup Got the Beat
 Kim Hyun-ah (stage name Hyuna, born 1992), South Korean female singer-songwriter, rapper and model
 Kim Hyun-joong (born 1986), South Korean male singer and actor, member of boy band SS501
 Kim Hyung-jun (born 1987), South Korean male singer and actor, member of boy band SS501
 Kim Hyung-soo (stage name K.Will, born 1981), South Korean male singer
 Kim In-soon (stage name Insooni, born 1957), South Korean female singer
 Kim Jae-duck (born 1979), South Korean male singer, member of boy band Sechs Kies
 Kim Jae-hwan (born 1996), South Korean male singer, former member of boy band Wanna One
 Kim Jae-joong (born 1986), South Korean male singer and actor, member of pop duo JYJ
 Jennie Kim (born 1996), South Korean female singer, member of girl group Blackpink
 Kim Ji-soo (singer, born 1990), South Korean male singer
 Kim Ji-soo (born 1995), South Korean female singer and actress, member of girl group Blackpink
 Kim Ji-won (stage name Bobby, born 1995), South Korean male rapper, member of boy band iKon
 Kim Ji-woo, (stage name Chuu, born 1999), South Korean female singer, member of girl group Loona
 Kim Ji-yeon (stage name Kei, born 1995), South Korean female singer, member of girl group Lovelyz
 Kim Jin-pyo (born 1977), South Korean male rapper, television presenter and professional race car driver
 Kim Jin-tae (stage name Verbal Jint, born 1980), South Korean male rapper and record producer
 Kim Jong-dae (stage name Chen, born 1992), South Korean male singer, member of boy band Exo
 Kim Jong-hyun (1990-2017), South Korean male singer, former member of boy band Shinee
 Kim Jong-hyeon (born 1995), South Korean male singer, former member of boy band NU'EST
 Kim Jong-in (stage name Kai, born 1994), South Korean male singer, member of boy band Exo
 Kim Jong-min (born 1979), South Korean male singer, member of band Koyote
 Kim Jong-woon (stage name Yesung, born 1984), South Korean male singer, member of boy band Super Junior
 Kim Ju-na (born 1994), South Korean female singer
 Kim Jun-myeon (stage name Suho, born 1991), South Korean male singer, member of boy band Exo
 Kim Junsu (stage name Xia, born 1986), South Korean male singer, member of pop duo JYJ
 Kim Ki-bum (stage name Key, born 1991), South Korean male singer, member of boy band Shinee
 Kim Kyu-jong (born 1987), South Korean male singer, member of boy band SS501
 Kim Min-ju (born 2001), South Korean female singer, former member of girl group Iz*One
 Kim Min-jun (stage name Jun. K, born 1988), South Korean male singer, member of boy band 2PM
 Kim Minseok (stage name Xiumin, born 1990), South Korean male singer, member of boy band Exo
 Kim Myung-soo (stage name L, born 1992), South Korean male singer, member of boy band Infinite
 Kim Nam-joo (born 1995), South Korean female singer, member of girl group Apink
 Kim Nam-joon (stage name RM, born 1994), South Korean male rapper, member of boy band BTS
 Kim Na-young (born 1991), South Korean female singer
 Kim Ryeo-wook (born 1987), South Korean male singer, member of boy band Super Junior
 Samuel Arredondo Kim (stage name Samuel, born 2002), American male singer, former member of duo 1Punch
 Kim Sang-woo (stage name Roy Kim, born 1993), South Korean male singer-songwriter
 Kim Se-jeong (born 1996), South Korean female singer and actress, former member of girl groups I.O.I and Gugudan
 Kim Se-hyeon (born 2000), South Korean male singer, member of boy band DKZ
 Kim Se-yong (born 1991), South Korean male singer, member of boy band Myname
 Kim Seok-jin (stage name Jin, born 1992), South Korean male singer, member of boy band BTS
 Kim Seol-hyun (born 1995), South Korean female singer and actress, member of girl group AOA
 Kim Si-hyeon (born 1999), South Korean female singer, member of girl group Everglow
 Kim So-hee (singer, born 1995), South Korean female singer, member of girl group I.B.I
 Kim So-hee (singer, born 1999), South Korean female singer, member of girl group ELRIS
 Kim So-hyang (born 1978), South Korean singer-songwriter
 Kim So-hye (born 1999), South Korean female singer and actress, former member of girl group I.O.I
 Kim So-ya (born 1990), South Korean female singer
 Kim Sung-kyu (born 1989), South Korean male singer, member of boy band Infinite
 Kim Tae-hyung (stage name V, born 1995), South Korean male singer, member of boy band BTS
 Kim Tae-woo (born 1981), South Korean male singer, member of boy band g.o.d
 Kim Tae-yeon (born 1989), South Korean female singer, member of girl group Girls' Generation and supergroup Got the Beat
 Kim Wonsik (stage name Ravi, born 1993), South Korean male rapper, member of boy band VIXX
 Kim Woo-jin (born 1997), South Korean male singer, former member of boy band Stray Kids
 Kim Woo-seok (born 1996), South Korean male singer, member of Up10tion
 Kim Yeon-ji (born 1986), South Korean female singer, former member of girl group SeeYa
 Kim Ye-rim (stage name Yeri, born 1999), South Korean female singer, member of girl group Red Velvet
 Kim Ye-won (stage name Umji, born 1998), South Korean female singer, member of girl group Viviz
 Kim Yeon-woo (born Kim Hak-chul 1971), South Korean male singer and vocal coach
 Kim Yo-han (born 1999), South Korean female singer, member of WEi
 Kim Yong-sun (stage name Solar, born 1991), South Korean female singer, member of girl group Mamamoo
 Kim Yoon-ji (stage name NS Yoon-G, born 1988), Korean-American female singer
 Kim Yu-bin (born 1988), South Korean female singer, former member of girl group Wonder Girls
 Yuliy Kim (born 1936), Russian male musician
 Kim Yu-ra (born 1992), South Korean female singer, member of girl group Girl's Day

Fashion
 André Kim (1935–2010), South Korean male fashion designer
 Christina Kim (born 1957), American female fashion designer
 Daul Kim (1989–2009), South Korean female fashion model
 Elaine Kim (born 1962), American female fashion designer
 Eugenia Kim, American female hat designer
 Yu-ri Kim (1989–2011), South Korean female fashion model

Politics

Pre-1945 Korea
 Kim Gu (1876–1949), Korean independence activist and politician
 Kim Hong-jip (1842–1896), 1st prime minister of the Korean Empire
 Kim Ja-jeom (1588–1652), Chief State Councillor of the Joseon dynasty

North Korea
 Kim Il-sung (1912–1994), 1st Supreme Leader of North Korea and leader of the Workers' Party of Korea
 Kim Jong-il (1941–2011), 2nd Supreme Leader of North Korea and leader of the Workers' Party of Korea
 Kim Jong-nam (1971–2017), eldest son of Kim Jong-il
 Kim Jong-un (born 1983), 3rd Supreme Leader of North Korea and leader of the Workers' Party of Korea
 Kim Kye-gwan (born 1943), North Korean politician and diplomat
 Kim Yong-il (born 1944), 10th Premier of North Korea
 Kim Yong-nam (born 1928), North Korea's former head of state

South Korea
 Kim Dae-jung (1924–2009), 8th male President of South Korea
 Kim Du-han (1918–1972), South Korean male mobster and politician
 Kim Hwang-sik (born 1948), 37th South Korean male prime minister
 Kim Jin-sun (born 1946), South Korean male politician, Governor of Gangwon Province
 Kim Jong-pil (1926–2018), 9th South Korean male prime minister
 Kim Kwan-yong (born 1942), South Korean male politician, Governor of North Gyeongsang province
 Kim Kyoung-soo (born 1967), South Korean male politician, former governor of South Gyeongsang province, convicted of opinion rigging
 Kim Moon-soo (born 1951), South Korean male politician, Governor of Gyeonggi province
 Kim Wan-ju (born 1946), South Korean male politician and Governor of North Jeolla province
 Kim Young-sam (1927–2015), 7th male President of South Korea
 Kim Yung-rok (born 1955), South Korean male politician, Governor of South Jeolla province

United States of America
 Andy Kim (born 1982), American male politician and former national security adviser to President Barack Obama
 Harry Kim (born 1939), American male politician and mayor of Hawaii County
 Ron Kim (born 1979), American male politician serving the 40th District of the New York State Assembly
 Sung Yong Kim (born 1960), American male diplomat
 Young Kim (born 1962), American female politician and former member of the California State Assembly

Ukraine
 Vitalii Kim (born 1981), Ukrainian male politician and the Governor of Mykolaiv Oblast

Religion
 Andrew Kim Taegon (1821–1846), first Korean-born Catholic priest and the patron saint of Korea
 Augustinus Kim Jong-soo (born 1956), South Korean Catholic titular bishop of Sufasar and bishop of the Diocese of Daejeon
 David Kwangshin Kim (1935-2022), South Korean male Protestant pastor
 Kim Gyo-gak (696-794), Korean Buddhist and a Silla prince
 Hae Jong Kim (1935-2020), Korean-American bishop of the United Methodist Church
 Heup Young Kim (born 1949), Korean Christian theologian
 Hyginus Kim Hee-jong (born 1947), Catholic Archbishop of Gwangju
 Paul Geun Sang Kim (born 1952), Anglican bishop of the Diocese of Seoul
 Paul Kim Ok-kyun (1925–2010), Catholic titular bishop of Girba
 Stephen Kim Sou-hwan (1922–2009), Catholic cardinal and Archbishop of Seoul
 Theophanes (Kim) (born 1976), Russian Orthodox archbishop and the first Eastern Orthodox bishop of Korean origin
 Young Oon Kim (1914–1989), Unification Church theologian and missionary

Sports

Association football
 Kim Bo-kyung, (born 1989), South Korean football player
 Kim Byung-ji, (born 1970), South Korean former football player
 Kim Do-heon, (born 1982), South Korean former football player
 Kim Do-hoon, (born 1970), South Korean former football player and manager
 Kim Dong-jin, (born 1982), South Korean former football player
 Kim Gwang-seok, (born 1983), South Korean football player
 Kim Hak-bum, (born 1960), South Korean football manager
 Kim Ho, (born 1944), South Korean former football player
 Kim Ho-kon, (born 1951), South Korean former football player and director
 Kim Jin-su, (born 1992), South Korean football player
 Kim Jong-boo, (born 1965), South Korean former football player and manager
 Kim Jong-hun, (born 1956), North Korean association football player and manager
 Kim Joo-sung, (born 1966), South Korean former football player
 Kim Jung-woo, (born 1982), South Korean former football player
 Kim Kum-il, (born 1987), North Korean footballer
 Kim Kyong-il (born 1970), North Korean footballer
 Kim Kyong-il (born 1988), North Korean footballer
 Kim Min-jae, (born 1996), South Korean football player
 Kim Myong-gil, (born 1984), North Korean footballer
 Kim Myong-won, (born 1983), North Korean footballer
 Kim Nam-il, (born 1977), South Korean former football player and manager
 Kim Sang-sik, (born 1976), South Korean former football player and manager
 Kim Seung-gyu, (born 1990), South Korean football player
 Kim Shin-wook, (born 1988), South Korean football player
 Kim Yong-jun, (born 1983), North Korean footballer
 Kim Young-gwon, (born 1990), South Korean football player

Baseball
 Kim Byung-hyun, (born 1979), Major League Baseball pitcher
 Kim Ha-seong, (born 1995), Major League Baseball player
 Kim Jong-kook, (born 1973), South Korean baseball player
 Kim Tae-gyun, (born 1971), South Korean baseball player
 Kim Tae-kyun, (born 1982), South Korean baseball player
 Gil Kim (born 1981), American baseball executive and coach

Golf
 Kim A-lim, (born 1995), LPGA golfer
 Anthony Kim, (born 1985), American golfer
 Birdie Kim, (born 1981), LPGA golfer
 Christina Kim, (born 1984), American golfer
 Kim Joo-mi, (born 1984), LPGA golfer
 Kim Hyo-joo, (born 1995), South Korean golfer
 Kim Kyung-tae, (born 1986), Asian Tour golfer
 Mi-Hyun Kim, (born 1977), LPGA golfer
 Kim Sei-young, (born 1993), South Korean LPGA golfer
 Kim Si-woo, (born 1995), South Korean PGA golfer

Tennis
 Alex Kim, (born 1978), American tennis player
 Kim Eun-ha, (born 1975), South Korean tennis player
 Kim Il-soon, (born 1969), South Korean tennis player
 Kevin Kim, (born 1978), American tennis player
 Kim Mi-ok, (born 1978), South Korean tennis player
 Kim Na-ri, (born 1990), South Korean tennis player

Volleyball
 Kim Yeon-koung, (born 1988), South Korean volleyball player
 Kim Hee-jin, (born 1991), South Korean volleyball player
 Kim Su-ji, (born 1987), South Korean volleyball player
 Kim Sa-nee, (born 1981), South Korean volleyball player
 Kim Hae-ran, (born 1984), South Korean volleyball player

Other sports
 Chloe Kim, (born 2000), American snowboarder, Olympic gold medalist
 Dong Hyun Kim, (born 1981), mixed martial artist in the Ultimate Fighting Championship
 Dong Hyun Kim, (born 1988), mixed martial artist
 Kim Jae-bum, (born 1985), Korean judoka, Olympic gold medalist
 Gail Kim, (born 1977), Canadian female professional wrestler
 Kim Ji-yeon, (born 1988), South Korean female sabre fencer, 2012 Summer Olympics Women's sabre gold medalist
 Jung-Yul Kim, (born 1973), Korean-Canadian former football player
 Kim Kuk-hyang, (born 1993), North Korean female Olympic weightlifter
 Kim Kum-ok, (born 1988), North Korean female long-distance runner
 Nellie Kim, (born 1957), Soviet gymnast, daughter of a Sakhalin Korean father
 Kim Sin-rak, (also known as Mitsuhiro Momota or Rikidōzan, 1924-1963), Korean-Japanese male professional wrestler
 Kim Taek-soo, (born 1970), South Korean male table tennis player
 Kim Won-kwon, (born 1918), South Korean female former track and field athlete
 Kim Yo-han, (born 1985), South Korean male volleyball player
 Kim Young-ho, (born 1971), retired South Korean foil fencer, 2000 Summer Olympic Men's foil gold medalist
 Yuna Kim, (born 1990), retired South Korean female figure skater, Olympic gold medalist
 Kim Duk-koo, (1955-1982), South Korean male professional boxer

Miscellaneous
 Brian Kim (also known as Bu Yung Kim, born 1975/76), American former hedge fund manager
 Kim Haki (born 1958), South Korean writer and ex political-prisoner
 Kim Ho-dong (born 1954), South Korean historian
 Kim Jae-young (born 1966), South Korean writer and professor
 Jaegwon Kim (1934–2019), Korean-American philosopher
 Jim Yong Kim (born 1959), physician, anthropologist, activist, former president of Dartmouth College, former World Bank president
 Jonny Kim (born 1984), American US Navy lieutenant commander (and former SEAL), physician, and NASA astronaut
 Kim Mi-wol (born 1977), South Korean writer
 Paul Kim (born 1970), Korean-American CTO of the Stanford Graduate School of Education
 Richard C. Kim, retired US brigadier general
 Kim Sagwa (born 1984), South Korean writer
 Scott Kim, (born 1955), American puzzle and video game designer
 W. Chan Kim (born 1951), South Korean business theorist
 Kim Wonu (born 1947), South Korean male novelist
 Young-Oak Kim (1919-2005), Korean-American US military officer, civic leader and humanitarian
 Yu Yeon Kim (born 1956), South Korean international curator

Fictional characters
 Kim Kaphwan, fictional character from the Fatal Fury series
 Kim Dong Hwan or Kim Jae Hoon, regular characters in Garou: Mark of the Wolves
 Kim Sue Il in Kizuna Encounter
 Harry Kim, from Star Trek: Voyager

See also
 Korean name
 Kim (surname)

Kim
Kim